Almond Pineda Vosotros (born January 26, 1990) is a Filipino professional basketball player for the TNT Tropang Giga of the Philippine Basketball Association (PBA). In 2018, he signed with Mono Thewphaingarm of the GSB Thailand Basketball Super League. After the season ended, he signed with PEA of the Thailand Basketball League.

High school career

Vosotros studied at San Sebastian College – Recoletos de Manila. He played a pivotal role in the Staglets’ historic fourth straight NCAA championship in 2008.

College career

Vosotros played collegiate basketball at DLSU where he first suited up for the Archers in 2010 and first earned his reputation as a clutch player. In his sophomore season with the Archers, he averaged 6.8 ppg while developing into a deadly shooter from three-point range. The following season, he earned the starting "two" spot and became the team’s second leading scorer with 10.5 points per outing, while converting 29 team-best three-point conversions. In 2013, he posted averages of 14 points (second behind Jeron Teng), five rebounds, two assists and one steal per game, while leading the Archers to their first championship since 2007. He also steered the Archers to the PCCL championship that same year. He last played for La Salle in 2014.

Amateur career

Vosotros suited up for the Cebuana Lhuillier Gems in the PBA D-League, where he scored a career-high 26 points in 2014.

Professional career

Vosotros was drafted by the Blackwater Elite with the 13th overall pick in the 2015 PBA draft. He signed a two-year rookie contract with the Elite.

PBA career statistics

As of the end of 2020 season

Season-by-season averages

|-
| align=left | 
| align=left | Blackwater
| 13 || 7.9 || .308 || .143 || .000 || .5 || .6 || .2 || .1 || 1.4
|-
| align=left | 
| align=left | TNT
| 15 || 9.4 || .406 || .417 || 1.000 || 1.1 || 1.0 || .2 || .0 || 2.3
|-
| align=left | 
| align=left | TNT
| 14 || 6.4 || .387 || .200 || .000 || .7 || .5 || .2 || .0 || 1.9
|-class=sortbottom
| align="center" colspan=2 | Career
| 42 || 7.9 || .371 || .244 || .800 || .8 || .7 || .2 || .0 || 1.9

International career

Vosotros was a member of the 12-man Sinag Pilipinas national team that competed in the 2015 Southeast Asian Games basketball tournament and 2015 SEABA Championship, both held in Singapore, where they won gold medals in both occasions.

References

External links
 
 

1990 births
Living people
Basketball players from Albay
Blackwater Bossing players
Filipino expatriate basketball people in Thailand
People from Albay
Philippines men's national basketball team players
Filipino men's basketball players
Point guards
San Sebastian College – Recoletos alumni
Southeast Asian Games gold medalists for the Philippines
Southeast Asian Games medalists in basketball
De La Salle Green Archers basketball players
Maharlika Pilipinas Basketball League players
Competitors at the 2015 Southeast Asian Games
Competitors at the 2017 Southeast Asian Games
TNT Tropang Giga players
Blackwater Bossing draft picks
Philippine Basketball Association All-Stars
Philippines national 3x3 basketball team players
PBA 3x3 players
Filipino men's 3x3 basketball players